Anthony Addabbo (September 14, 1960 – October 18, 2016) was an American actor and model.

Early years
Addabbo was born on September 14, 1960, in Coral Gables. He grew up in Virginia Beach, Virginia. Addabbo wanted to become a tree surgeon. He graduated from Virginia Tech in Blacksburg, Virginia. In 1987, Addabbo settled in New York City, where he worked as a model.

Career

Television
Addabbo made his debut on the small screen in the TV western shooting bettas in The Gunfighters in 1987. Recognition among viewers earned him the role of Jason Craig in the NBC soap opera Generations from 1989 to 1990. He guest starred on a number of television series including Dallas, Dangerous Women, Life Goes On, Cheers, Wings, Pacific Blue and The Nanny as Mike LaVoe. Addabbo was in several made-for-TV-movies including Calendar Girl, Cop, Killer? The Bambi Bembenek Story, Love on the Run, and Body Politic. Body Politic was intended to be a television series for The CW. On August 4, 2009, Dawn Ostroff announced that the project was officially dead for the CW. Other soap operas include All My Children, The Bold and the Beautiful, and Guiding Light.

Film
Addabbo was in 1992's Inside Out IV,  1994's Red Shoe Diaries:9 Hotline, and 1995's Red Shoe Diaries: Weekend Pass. He was in 1998's Black Sea 213 and A Place Called Truth. Addabbo was in 2001's Supertalk, 2002's Red Shoe Diaries: Forbidden Zone, and 2009's My One and Only. My One and Only was loosely based on a story about George Hamilton's early life on the road with his mother and brother, featuring anecdotes that Hamilton had told to producer Robert Kosberg and Merv Griffin.

Personal life and death
On June 7, 1999, Addabbo married Elli Pattino, with whom he has a son, Brandon, born on December 11, 1998. On October 18, 2016, he died of unknown causes.

Filmography

Film

Television

References

Sources

External links

 
 

1960 births
2016 deaths
American male soap opera actors
Male actors from Florida
Male models from Florida
Virginia Tech alumni
People from Virginia Beach, Virginia
Male actors from Virginia
Male models from Virginia
American male television actors
American male film actors
20th-century American male actors
21st-century American male actors
People from Coral Gables, Florida